Derenik-Ashot  Artsruni (died 958/959) was the second King of Vaspurakan, from the Artsruni dynasty, succeeding his father, Gagik I, on the latter's death. He died childless in 958/959 and was succeeded by his younger brother Abusahl-Hamazasp.

His daughter's name was Sofy

References

950s deaths
10th-century monarchs of Vaspurakan
Artsruni dynasty
Year of birth unknown
10th-century Armenian people